Caballero  is a corregimiento in Antón District, Coclé Province, Panama. It was created by Law 58 of July 29, 1998, owing to the Declaration of Unconstitutionality of Law 1 of 1982. Its population as of 2000 was 3,111.

References

Corregimientos of Coclé Province